Bisnius is a genus of beetles belonging to the family Staphylinidae.

The genus was first described by Stephens in 1829.

The genus has cosmopolitan distribution.

Selected species:
 Bisnius cephalotes
 Bisnius fimetarius
 Bisnius nigriventris
 Bisnius nitidulus
 Bisnius puella
 Bisnius scoticus
 Bisnius sordidus
 Bisnius spermophili
 Bisnius subuliformis

References

Staphylininae
Staphylinidae genera